Christmas Flow is a 2021 French streaming television series created by Henri Debeurme, Marianne Levy and Victor Rodenbach and starring Tayc, Shirine Boutella and Marion Séclin. It premiered on Netflix on 17 November 2021 and consists of 3 episodes.

Cast 
 Tayc as Marcus
 Shirine Boutella as Lila
 Marion Séclin as Alice
 Aloïse Sauvage as Jeanne
 Camille Lou as Mel
 Walid Ben Mabrouk as Zack
 Estelle Meyer as Safia
 Stéphan Wojtowicz as Pascal
 Yasmine Kefil as Sara
 Isabelle Candelier as Danièle
 Philippe Rebbot as Daniel
 Nuts as Le Chien
 Angélique Kidjo as mother of Marcus

See also
 List of Christmas films

References

External links

 
 

2021 French television series debuts
French-language Netflix original programming
Christmas television series